Kolar Dam is located on 35 km south-west of Bhopal city. It is built on Kolar river which is a tributary river of Narmada river. This dam is constructed near Lawakhweri village in Sehore district.

Specifications
Dam water is a raw water source for Kolar Water Treatment Plant which is managed by Public Health Engineering Department of Madhya Pradesh. This plant avails approx. 153 MLD treated water to Bhopal city which is 60% of total water supply to city. Its water treatment plant is largest and best among water treatment plants arranging water supply to Bhopal city.

Purpose
 Irrigation and Water supply for bhopal city

See also
 
 List of reservoirs and dams in India

References

Dams in Madhya Pradesh
Year of establishment missing
Sehore district